Hello, Everybody! is a 1933 American Pre-Code musical film directed by William A. Seiter and written by Lawrence Hazard, Fannie Hurst, and Dorothy Yost. The film stars Kate Smith, Randolph Scott, Sally Blane, Charley Grapewin, George Barbier, Wade Boteler and Julia Swayne Gordon. The film was released on February 17, 1933, by Paramount Pictures.

Plot
The setting is a farm. Kate Smith and Sally Blane play sisters; assorted relatives live with the sisters, but everyone at home, and in the whole town, depends on Kate to hold everything together. The power company wants to build a dam which will require flooding many of the farms; Kate is holding out; if Kate sells, everyone else will sell; if Kate refuses, the rest of the town will refuse as well. Randolph Scott meets Kate's beautiful sister, Sally Blane, at a dance. Randolph Scott, as it turns out, is an agent for the power company. Kate thinks he's just using Sally; Sally believes that he truly likes her. Randolph comes to the farm and appears to woo Kate. Kate remains unconvinced about selling out, but falls for Randolph.

Cast

Production
The film cost over $2 million to make.

References

Works cited

External links
 

1933 films
1930s English-language films
American musical films
1933 musical films
Paramount Pictures films
Films directed by William A. Seiter
American black-and-white films
1930s American films